The 1946 season of the Primera División Peruana, the top category of Peruvian football, was played by 8 teams. The national champions were Universitario.

Results

Standings

External links 
 Peru 1946 season at RSSSF
 Peruvian Football League News 

Peru1
Peruvian Primera División seasons
1